Cardiff Heliport,  is a heliport located in Tremorfa, Cardiff, Wales, approximately  from the city centre.

The heliport is leased and operated by Wales Air Ambulance.
The heliport cost £3.8 million to build and was the operating base for the South Wales Police helicopter. The heliport can also handle passenger traffic, especially during sporting events at the Millennium Stadium.

In 2016, the heliport became the base for an additional helicopter from the Wales Air Ambulance fleet, operating specialist hospital transfers with in-flight incubators to transport babies.

References

External links
 
   

Transport in Cardiff
Heliports in Wales
Airports in Wales
Buildings and structures in Cardiff